María del Socorro García Quiroz (born 31 January 1968) is a Mexican politician affiliated with the Institutional Revolutionary Party. As of 2014 she served as Senator of the LXI Legislature of the Mexican Congress representing Querétaro as replacement of José Eduardo Calzada Rovirosa.

References

1968 births
Living people
People from Querétaro City
Women members of the Senate of the Republic (Mexico)
Members of the Senate of the Republic (Mexico)
Institutional Revolutionary Party politicians
21st-century Mexican politicians
21st-century Mexican women politicians
Politicians from Querétaro
Autonomous University of Queretaro alumni